Lôn Las Menai is part of Lôn Las Cymru, the Welsh National Cycle Route, which is about  long.

Lôn Las Menai is the section which runs for  along a section of the former Caernarfon to Bangor railway trackbed.  From the north of Caernarfon it just runs to the north side of Y Felinheli.

See also 
 Rail trail

References

External links
Gwynedd Council - Recreational Routes - Lôn Las Menai
Sustrans Routes2Ride: Cycling Lôn Las Menai

Cycleways in Wales
Transport in Gwynedd
Rail trails in Wales